The Bellwood-Antis School District is a small, rural public school district located in Blair County, Pennsylvania. It serves the Borough of Bellwood and Antis Township. According to 2000 federal census data, it serves a resident population of 8,435.

Schools
 Myers Elementary School (Grades K-4)220 Martin StreetBellwood, Pennsylvania 16617
 Bellwood-Antis Middle School (Grades 5-8)400 Martin StreetBellwood, Pennsylvania 16617
 Bellwood-Antis High School (Grades 9-12)300 Martin StreetBellwood, Pennsylvania 16617

Extracurriculars
The district offers a variety of clubs, activities and sports.

Athletics
The district funds the following sports:

 Baseball - Class AA
 Basketball - Class AA 
 Cross Country - Class AA
 Football - Class A
 Golf - Class AA
 Track and Field - Class AA
 Wrestling - Class AA
 Shares a soccer team with Tyrone Area School District- Class AA

Girls
Basketball - AA
Field Hockey - AA
Soccer (Fall) - A
Softball - AA
Volleyball - AA
 Track and Field - Class AA

Middle School Sports

Boys
Basketball
Football
Wrestling	

Girls
Basketball
Softball 
Volleyball

According to PIAA directory July 2012

References

External links
 Bellwood-Antis School District
 PIAA Pennsylvania Interscholastic Athletic Association
 Greater Altoona Area Career and Technology Center
 Appalachia Intermediate Unit 8

School districts in Blair County, Pennsylvania